Mount Hope Catholic Cemetery is a Catholic cemetery at 305 Erskine Avenue in Toronto, Ontario, Canada.

History

Mount Hope was created near the end of the 19th Century when the Archdiocese of Toronto was faced with a capacity issue at St. Michael's Cemetery.  Land was found further north of Toronto and Mount Hope was consecrated on July 9, 1898, by Catholic Archbishop John Walsh. The first burial occurred on March 27, 1900.  Within 50 years, Mount Hope was facing a capacity issue and in 1954 Holy Cross Cemetery, Thornhill, Ontario, opened to ease the burden on Mount Hope. With additional land added next to the property, Burke Brook Ravine was buried as storm sewer in 1960 (the ravine exists northeast of the cemetery through Sunnydene Park). 

The cemetery contains the graves of 147 Commonwealth service personnel from both World Wars, registered by the Commonwealth War Graves Commission.

For the cemetery's centennial, the Catholic Cemeteries Archdiocese of Toronto published A History of Mount Hope Cemetery Toronto Ontario 1898 to 1998 written by Michael Power.

By the end of the 20th century, the cemetery was full, holding the remains of more than 76,000 persons. However, a columbarium was built to house the remains of those who had been cremated.

Notable burials

Some of the notables interred here are:
Margaret Anglin (1876–1958), stage actress
Timothy Warren Anglin (1822–1896), newspaper editor, politician
Morley Callaghan (1903–1990), writer
Francis "King" Clancy (1903–1986), Hall of Fame ice hockey player and coach
Cal Gardner (1924–2001), NHL ice hockey player
 Arthur W. Holmes (1865–1944), architect
Louis Quilico (1925–2000), opera baritone
Reginald "Hooley" Smith (1903–1963) Hall of Fame ice hockey player
Frederick Albert Tilston (1906–1992), Victoria Cross recipient
Jean Wilson (1910–1933), Olympic speed-skating gold medalist
William R. Allen (1919–1985), 2nd Chairman of Metropolitan Toronto, namesake of the Allen Expressway
Denis T. O'Connor (1841–1911) Roman Catholic Archbishop of Toronto
Frank Tunney (1912–1983), wrestling promoter
Annie Thompson (1845–1913), wife of former Prime Minister John Thompson

References

External links
 

1898 establishments in Ontario
Cemeteries in Toronto
Cemeteries in Ontario
Cemeteries in Canada
Roman Catholic cemeteries in Canada
Catholic organizations established in the 19th century